Ruti Broudo (born 1961) is an Israeli celebrity chef.

Career
She runs the R2M Restaurant Group, and has founded culinary institutions such as Hotel Montefiore, Herzl 16, the Bakery chain, the Delicatessen chain, and the Brasserie. During the COVID-19 pandemic, she made public pleas on television and in newspapers to save the culinary industry in Israel. She also called on her followers to join protests. During the pandemic, she closed Brasserie. She has judged the national television show MKR: Winning Kitchen.

In 2021, she joined MasterChef Israel as a judge for the 10th season. TV critics said she did not change the show much and that it remained mostly the same. The magazine At wrote that she is the only Israeli women chef to judge two separate cooking shows. Broudo said she started going to a psychologist because of MasterChef.

She was honoured by the Knight Club of Israel as a top chef of Israel.

Personal life
Broudo was born in 1961 in Netanya. She is married to, but separated from, Mati Broudo who is her partner in the R2M group. She is in a long-term relationship with chef Guy Polak. She has no children, saying she wanted to concentrate on building the business. Her father, from Hungary, survived Auschwitz. Her mother, Yehudit Friedlander, was in a Nazi work camp as a four year old and survived after she escaped with her family to the woods with partisans.

References

he:רותי ברודו

Living people
1961 births
People from Netanya
Israeli television chefs
Women chefs